Hospital OS is a research and development project for a hospital management software to support small hospitals. It is supported by the Thailand Research Fund and is free software released under the GNU GPL.

Hospital OS is implemented in 95 small rural hospitals and 402 health centres serving at least 5 million patients.

See also
GNU Health
HOSxP
List of open-source health software

References

External links

OpenClinical Open Source downloads: Hospital OS

Free health care software
Information technology in Thailand